The United Kingdom participated in the Eurovision Song Contest 1987 with its entry "Only the Light" performed by Rikki and written by Richard Peebles. Same The song was chosen through the A Song for Europe national final which consisted of ten songs in 1987. At the Eurovision Song Contest 1987, Rikki and his song was placed thirteenth with 47 points.

Before Eurovision

A Song for Europe 1987 
In a change to previous years, 10 songs were performed instead of the usual eight. None of the performers had ever performed in A Song for Europe before, and none of the writers had ever written for the contest before. As well as Music Publisher's Association selecting some of the songs, songs from record publishers were also submitted. They were selected in the following manner (as recounted by the radio commentator during the interval act): "Around 400 songs were selected by the Music Publisher's Association and the British Phonographic Industries. These songs were reviewed by 10 juries of 6 people, whittling them down to 50 songs. They were down reduced to 20 songs, which were sent to the BBC, and the 10 were chosen by producer Brian Whitehouse, Mike Batt, Bruce Welch, some radio and television producers, and representatives from the MPA and BPI". The interval act was a pre-recorded dancing performance by The Anthony Van Laast Dancers.

Final 
The final was held on 10 April 1987, live from Studio 1 of the BBC Television Centre, London. The contest was hosted by Terry Wogan. It was also broadcast on BBC Radio 2, and this was the first and only instance in which the radio commentator could also be heard on television, passing comment after each song, and during the interval act. The BBC Concert Orchestra under the direction of Ronnie Hazlehurst as conductor accompanied all the songs, but despite performing live, the orchestra were off-screen, behind the set. Hazlehurst's arrangement of the title music which had made its debut the previous year, was an upbeat arrangement of the traditional Te Deum music and was used again for the title sequence.

Nine regional juries located in Birmingham, Cardiff, Manchester, Belfast, Edinburgh, London, Norwich, Newcastle and Bristol voted for the songs. Juries ranked the songs internally and awarded 15 points to their favourite, 12 to the second, 10 to the third, 9 to the fourth, 8 to the fifth, 7 to the sixth, 6 to the seventh, 5 to the eighth, 3 to the ninth and 1 to their least preferred.

UK Discography 
Rikki - Only The Light: OK Records OK010 (7" Single)/ OKL010 (12" Single).
Siy - Lion Within: Silent SIL2.
Mike Stacey - I Want You: Sierra FED35.
Mal Pope - Everybody: Black Mountain BM154.
Ann Turner - Too Hot To Handle: RCA PB41283 (7" Single)/PT41284 (12" Single).
Ian Prince - Master Of The Game: Virgin VS966 (7" Single)/VS966-12 (12" Single).
Gordon Campbell - Just Let Me: Rocket 888489-7 (Dutch release only).
Zuice - Bless Your Lucky Stars: Mercury MER244 (7" Single)/MERX244 (12" Single).
John T Ford - What You Gonna Do?: Splash CPS1010.
Heavy Pettin' - Romeo: Polydor POSP 849 (7" Single)/POSPX849 (12" Single).

At Eurovision
"Only the Light" was performed 14th in the running order on the night of the contest, following Luxembourg and preceding France. At the close of the voting, United Kingdom had received 47 points, placing 13th out of 22 competing countries. It was the worst performing entry of the UK up to that point, and would remain so for the next 13 years, until 2000.

The UK jury awarded its 12 points to the contest winners Ireland.

Voting

References 

1987
Countries in the Eurovision Song Contest 1987
Eurovision
Eurovision